Larriva is a surname. Notable people with the surname include: 

Enriqueta Arvelo Larriva (1886-1962), Venezuelan poet
Guadalupe Larriva (1956-2007), Ecuadorian politician
Lastenia Larriva (1848-1924), Peruvian poet, writer, and journalist
Rudy Larriva (1916-2010), American animator and director 
Tito Larriva (born 1953), Mexican/American musician and actor